The following is a list of notable events and releases of the year 1963 in Norwegian music.

Events

May
 The 11th Bergen International Festival started in Bergen, Norway.

July
 The 3rd Moldejazz started in Molde, Norway.

Albums released

Unknown date

G
 Rowland Greenberg Quartet
 Live at Metrol 7-inch EP (Harmoni Records)

Deaths

 April
 11 – Arvid Gram Paulsen, jazz saxophonist, trumpeter, and composer (born 1922).
 19 – Gunnar Kjeldaas, composer (born 1890).

Births

 February
 2 – Vigleik Storaas, jazz pianist and composer.
 7 – Einar Røttingen, classical pianist and music teacher.

 March
 31 – Geir Rognø, bassist.

 April
 8 – Tine Asmundsen, jazz bassist.
 28 – Henrik Hellstenius, composer and musicologist.

 June
 2 – Per Arne Glorvigen, bandoneon player and composer.
 4 – Solveig Kringlebotn, operatic soprano.

 July
 19 – Sverre Indris Joner, pianist, composer, and music arranger.

 August
 14 – Kjartan Kristiansen, guitarist and backing vocalist (DumDum Boys).
 31 – Baard Slagsvold, bassist and singer (Tre Små Kinesere).

 October
 5 – Ronni Le Tekrø, guitarist (TNT).
 16 – Doddo Andersen, singer-songwrriter.
 22 – Benedicte Adrian, singer and artist.

 December
 4 – Ingrid Bjørnov, singer, songwriter, keyboard player, composer and text writer.
 10 – Ole Amund Gjersvik, upright bassist and composer.
 25 – Øystein Fevang, singer and choir conductor.

 Unknown date
 Johan Sara, Sami yoiker, guitarist, and composer.

See also
 1963 in Norway
 Music of Norway
 Norway in the Eurovision Song Contest 1963

References

 
Norwegian music
Norwegian
Music
1960s in Norwegian music